Okučani is a village and municipal centre in western Slavonia, Croatia. It is located 19 km southeast of Novska and 17 km west of Nova Gradiška.

History 
Before 18th century, village was known by the name of Dijanovci, when it was renamed in Okučani, by the meander ("okuka") of the Sloboština river.

Okučani was captured and incorporated into the Serbian Autonomous Oblast of Western Slavonia early in the Croatian War for Independence.  After being annexed by the unrecognized Republic of Serbian Krajina, Okučani and the rest of the pocket were liberated by Croatian Forces after Operation Flash on May 1, 1995.

See also
Okučani railway station

References

External links 
 Opcina webpage in Croatian
 Town Webpage in Croatian

Populated places in Brod-Posavina County
Slavonia
Municipalities of Croatia